Kuthyas Kawejan ( Sindhi ڪٺيس ڪويڄن ) is a book on literary criticism in Sindhi language written by renowned Sindhi critic Mubarak Ali Lashari. It is published by Sambara Publication, Hyderabad in March 2016. It is divided into two sections, Criticism and  Literature.The Criticism section contains fourteen scholarly articles  whereas Literary section contains eight articles on different topics.

See also 
Sindhi literature

References

2016 non-fiction books
Books of literary criticism